Fabrice Bry (born April 2, 1972 in Saint-Pierre-lès-Nemours, Seine-et-Marne) is a retired volleyball player from France, who earned a total number of 85 caps for the Men's National Team.

International Competitions
1997 – European Championship (4th place)
1999 – World League (7th place)
1999 – European Championship (6th place)
2000 – World League (7th place)
2001 – World League (6th place)
2001 – European Championship (7th place)

References
 L'Equipe Profile

1972 births
Living people
French men's volleyball players
Sportspeople from Seine-et-Marne
Panathinaikos V.C. players